Erika Lee is the Rudolph J. Vecoli Chair and Director of the Immigration History Research Center at the University of Minnesota and an award-winning non-fiction writer.

Early life
Lee is the granddaughter of Chinese immigrants. She grew up in the San Francisco Bay Area.

Career 
Lee graduated with a degree in history at Tufts University in 1991 before continuing her studies at the University of California, Berkeley, where she earned an M.A. in 1993 and a PhD in 1998. She has authored four books on American history, which have received several awards. At America's Gates: Chinese Immigration during the Exclusion Era, 1882–1943 (2003) won the 2003 Theodore Saloutos prize for the best book in immigration studies and the 2003 History Book Award from the Association for Asian American Studies. Angel Island: Immigrant Gateway to America (2010) received the Caughey Prize in Western History from the Western History Association as well as the 2010 Adult Non-Fiction Award in Asian Pacific American Literature from the American Library Association. The Making of Asian America: A History (2016) won the 2015–2016 Asian/Pacific American Awards for Literature in Adult Non-Fiction from the Asian Pacific American Librarians Association America for Americans: A History of Xenophobia in the United States (2019) won the 2020 American Book Awards from the Before Columbus Foundation.

Published works

Books

Contributions

Journal articles

Awards
 2018 Andrew Carnegie Fellowship
 2018 Distinguished Historian Award from the Society for Historians of the Gilded Age and Progressive Era
 2018 Distinguished Lecturer in the Organization of American Historians

References

External links
Faculty Page – University of Minnesota
Erika Lee Homepage

University of Minnesota faculty
People from San Francisco
University of California, Berkeley alumni
American women writers
Women historians
American women academics
Historians from California
American writers of Asian descent